An undeciphered writing system is a written form of language that is not currently understood.

Many undeciphered writing systems date from several thousand years BC, though some more modern examples do exist.  The term "writing systems" is used here loosely to refer to groups of glyphs which appear to have representational symbolic meaning, but which may include "systems" that are largely artistic in nature and are thus not examples of actual writing.

The difficulty in deciphering these systems can arise from a lack of known language descendants or from the languages being entirely isolated, from insufficient examples of text having been found and even (such as in the case of Vinča) from the question of whether the symbols actually constitute a writing system at all. Some researchers have claimed to be able to decipher certain writing systems, such as those of Epi-Olmec, Phaistos and Indus texts; but to date, these claims have not been widely accepted within the scientific community, or confirmed by independent researchers, for the writing systems listed here (unless otherwise specified).

Proto-writing
Certain forms of proto-writing remain undeciphered and, because of a lack of evidence and linguistic descendants, it is quite likely that they will never be deciphered.

Neolithic signs in China 
Yellow River civilization
Jiahu symbols – Peiligang culture, from China, c. 6600 - 6200 BC.
Damaidi symbols - Damaidi, from China, earliest estimated dates range from Paleolithic to c. 3000 years ago
Dadiwan symbols - Dadiwan, from China, c. 5800 - 5400 BC.
Banpo symbols – Yangshao culture, from China, 5th millennium BC.
Jiangzhai symbols - Yangshao culture, from China, 4th millennium BC.
Dawenkou symbols - Dawenkou culture, c. 2800 - 2500 BC.
Longshan symbols - Longshan culture, from China, c. 2500 - 1900 BC.
Yangtze civilization
Wucheng symbols - Wucheng culture, from China, c. 1600 BC 
Other areas
Sawveh - Guangxi, from China; possible proto-writing or writing

Neolithic signs in Europe 
Dispilio Tablet – Neolithic Europe, from Greece, c. 5202 BC.
Vinča symbols – Neolithic Europe, from Central Europe and Southeastern Europe, c. 4500 BC - 4000 BC.

Afro-Eurasian scripts

Indian Sub continent
Indus script, c. 3300 BC to 1900 BC.
Vikramkhol inscription, c. 1500 BC
Megalithic graffiti symbols, c. 1000 BC - 300 AD, possible writing system and possible descendant of Indus script
Pushkarasari script – Gandhara, 3rd century BC to 8th century AD.
Shankhalipi, c. 4th to 8th century

West Asia
Proto-Elamite, c. 3200 BC 
Byblos syllabary – the city of Byblos, c. 1700 BC
Cypro-Minoan syllabary, c. 1550 BC
Para-Lydian script, known from a single inscription found in Sardis Synagogue, c. 400–350 BC.
Sidetic script – Asia Minor, c. 5th to 3rd centuries BC.

East Asia
Ba–Shu scripts, 5th to 4th century BC.
Khitan large script and Khitan small script – Khitan, 10th century, not fully deciphered.
Tujia script

Southeast Asia
Singapore Stone, a fragment of a sandstone slab inscribed with an ancient Southeast Asian script, perhaps Old Javanese or Sanskrit. At least 13th century, and possibly as early as 10th to 11th century

Central Asia
Issyk inscription, Kazakhstan, c. 4th century BC

Europe
Cretan hieroglyphs, c. 2100 BC.
Linear A and Cretan hieroglyphs are both believed to be an example of the Minoan language. Several words have been decoded from the scripts, but no definite conclusions on the meanings of the words have been made.
Phaistos Disc, c. 2000 BC.
Linear A, c. 1800 BC, a syllabary
Grakliani Hill script - Grakliani Hill, c. 11th - 10th century BC
Paleohispanic scripts
Southwest Paleohispanic script, from c. 700 BC
Sitovo inscription
Alekanovo inscription, c. 10th - 11th century
 Rohonc Codex
 Folio 7r-v of British Library manuscript MS 73525, pre-1550, possibly liturgical.
 Voynich manuscript, carbon dated to the 15th century.
 Some scholars consider the corpus of Pictish symbol stones to be an undeciphered writing system

North Africa
The Starving of Saqqara - possibly dating to pre-dynastic Egypt
Ancient inscriptions in Somalia, According to the Ministry of Information and National Guidance of Somalia, inscriptions can be found on various old Taalo Tiiriyaad structures. These are enormous stone mounds found especially in northeastern Somalia. Among the main sites where these Taalo are located are Xabaalo Ambiyad in Alula District, Baar Madhere in Beledweyne District, and Harti Yimid in Las Anod District.
Numidian language (although the script, Libyco-Berber, has been almost fully deciphered, the language has not)
Meroitic language, c. 300 BC to 400 AD, though the Meroitic script is largely deciphered, the underlying language is not.
Ṣǝḥuf ʾǝmni inscription (although written in the well-known South Arabian script, the language has not yet been identified)

Sub-Saharan Africa
Ikom monoliths – Cross River State, Nigeria
Eghap script – Cameroon, c. 1900, partially deciphered.

American scripts

Andean South America
Khipu – Inka Empire and predecessor states, like the Wari Empire or the Caral-Supe Civilization, c. 2600 BC - 17th century, with some variants still in use today; it could possibly be a writing system or a set of writing systems.

Mesoamerica
Olmec – Olmec civilization, c. 600 BC, possibly the oldest Mesoamerican script.
Epio-olmec, c. 400 BC–500 AD, apparently logosyllabic. 
Zapotec – Zapotec. Possibly logosyllabic, c. 500 BC–700 AD.
Teotihuacan. Possibly descended from the Zapotec script, and itself being the probable ancestor of the Post-classic Mixtec and Aztec scripts, c. 100 BC - 700 AD.
Mixtec – Mixtec,  12th–14th century, the pictographic elements which accompany the script are well-understood, but semantic and linguistic components of the script proper are less well known.

Pacific scripts
Rongorongo – Rapa Nui (aka Easter Island), before 1860.

Related concepts: texts that are not writing systems
One very similar concept is that of false writing systems, which appear to be writing but are not. False writing cannot be deciphered because it has no semantic meaning. These particularly include asemic writing created for artistic purposes. One prominent example is the Codex Seraphinianus.

Another similar concept is that of undeciphered cryptograms, or cipher messages. These are not writing systems per se, but a disguised form of another text. Of course any cryptogram is intended to be undecipherable by anyone except the intended recipient so vast numbers of these exist, but a few examples have become famous and are listed in list of ciphertexts.

References

External links
 Proto-Elamite (CDLI link)
 Vinča signs (The Old European Script: Further evidence - Shan M. M. Winn)